"The Game" is a song by Echo & the Bunnymen. It was released on 1 June 1987 as the first single from their eponymous album of that year; this reached number 28 on the UK Singles Chart.

The single was released on WEA Records in 7-inch and 12-inch formats. The B-side is "Lost and Found"; the additional track on the 12-inch single is "Ship of Fools", which was produced by the group and Gil Norton.

The video was shot in Rio de Janeiro, Brazil.

Track listings
All tracks written by Will Sergeant, Ian McCulloch, Les Pattinson and Pete de Freitas.

7-inch (WEA YZ 134)
"The Game" – 3:50
"Lost and Found" – 3:52

12-inch release (WEA YZ 134T)
"The Game" – 3:50
"Lost and Found" – 3:52
"Ship of Fools" – 4:06

Chart positions

Personnel

Musicians
Ian McCulloch – vocals, guitar
Will Sergeant – lead guitar
Les Pattinson – bass
Pete de Freitas – drums

Production
Laurie Latham – producer on "The Game" and "Lost and Found"
The Bunnymen – producer on "Ship of Fools"
Gil Norton – producer and engineer on "Ship of Fools"
Paul Gomersall – engineer on "The Game" and "Lost and Found"
Stuart Barry – engineer on "The Game" and "Lost and Found"
Bruce Lampcov – mixing on "The Game" and "Lost and Found"

References

External links
Promotional video on Echo & the Bunnymen official website

1987 singles
Echo & the Bunnymen songs
Songs written by Ian McCulloch (singer)
Songs written by Will Sergeant
Songs written by Les Pattinson
Songs written by Pete de Freitas
1987 songs
Warner Music Group singles